The Bushcaddy R-120 is a Canadian kit aircraft produced by Canadian Light Aircraft Sales and Service (CLASS) of St. Lazare, Quebec and later Les Cedres, Quebec and now Bushcaddy of Lachute, Quebec and more recently Cornwall Regional Airport in Summerstown, Ontario.

The R-120 is a development of the Bushcaddy R-80 and is supplied as a kit for amateur construction.

Design and development
The aircraft was designed to comply with the Canadian  and United States amateur-built aircraft rules. It features a strut-braced high-wing, a two-seats-in-side-by-side configuration enclosed cockpit, fixed tricycle landing gear or conventional landing gear and a single engine in tractor configuration. The R-120 is structurally strengthened over the R-80 to allow a higher gross weight and accept larger engines.

The aircraft is made from 6061-T6 aluminum sheet over a cage of welded aluminum square 6061-T6 aluminum tube. The tail boom is conventional semi-monocoque construction. The non-tapered planform wings have 6061-T6 ribs and spars and employ a NACA 4413 (mod) airfoil. The airfoil modification removes the undercamber on the bottom of the wing, which makes construction easier, without giving up low speed performance. The aircraft's structure uses 2024-T3 aluminium for critical parts where extra strength is required, such as the spar, float and strut attachments as well as other critical components like the rudder horns. The R-120's structure is covered with 6061-T6 sheet of varying thicknesses. The wings are supported by conventional "V" struts. 6061-T6 is predominantly used for its lower cost and also its better corrosion resistance, since many R-120s are flown on floats. Flaps are optional.

Standard engines used on the R-120 include the  Rotax 912UL, the  Rotax 912ULS, the turbocharged  Rotax 914, the  Continental O-200, the  Lycoming O-235, the  Jabiru 3300 and other four-stroke powerplants. The aircraft can also be mounted on floats and skis. Controls include a central "Y" control stick.

Construction time for the R-120 from the factory kit is 1,000 hours.

Variants

CLASS R-120 BushCaddy
Version produced by CLASS of Saint-Lazare, Quebec. Production was later moved to Les Cedres, Quebec.
Bushcaddy R-120
Current production version produced by Bushcaddy of Lachute, Quebec after buying the rights from CLASS in 2011.

Specifications (R-120)

References

External links

Official website

1990s Canadian ultralight aircraft
Homebuilt aircraft
Light-sport aircraft
Single-engined tractor aircraft